Betsy Bang née Garrett (1912–2003) was an American biologist, scientific and medical illustrator.  She also translated folk tales from Bengali to English. Her scientific work was notable for her finding that many bird species have a sense of smell, a question that had long remained unsettled. Her works included Functional Anatomy of the Olfactory System in 23 Orders of Birds, published in 1971.

Biography 
Born in Lancaster, North Carolina, Betsy Garrett was raised in Washington D.C., enrolled in public schools there and earned her bachelor's degree from George Washington University in 1933.

She moved to Baltimore and studied medical illustration at the Johns Hopkins School of Medicine with Max Broedel, "the world-renowned medical illustrator who was credited with bringing 'art to medicine'."

She took to scientific research in ornithology late in life. Through her detailed dissections, she uncovered the olfactory systems in many bird species.

Indian folk tales 
Her husband, Fred Bang, was appointed the director of the Johns Hopkins Centers for Medical Research Training in India and Bangladesh from 1961 to 1976. While there, Betsy Bang became interested in the culture of the Indian subcontinent and learned to read Bengali. She used her knowledge to translate folk tales, which she published in English. She also researched and wrote widely about Sitala, the Hindu goddess for curing poxes, sores, and diseases.

Personal life 
She met Frederik Bang when she was studying medical illustration at Johns Hopkins University in Baltimore, and he was there as a first year medical student.  Interviewed at age 90, she recalled their first encounter
In 1940, they married, and eventually he was named chairman of the parasitology department at the Johns Hopkins University School of Hygiene. She created illustrations for some of his medical work and they published several papers together. He died in 1981.

The children of Betsy and Fred Bang included Caroline (1941–1996), Axel and Molly, who illustrated her translations of folk tales and is listed as co-author.

Betsy Bang moved to Woods Hole, Massachusetts after her husband's death. The Bangs had a long association with the Marine Biological Laboratory there having first arrived in 1952 to conduct research; they returned for many summers thereafter to work. In Woods Hole, Betsy volunteered and conducted tours at the laboratory and helped computerize its vast catalog of books. She also volunteered at the town's public library until she was 90.

Betsy Bang died at her home in Woods Hole, Massachusetts on October 31, 2003 at 91 years of age.

Selected publications 
Betsy Bang is first author of works that appeared in numerous journals and books.
 Bang, Betsy Garrett. "The nasal organs of the Black and Turkey Vultures; a comparative study of the cathartid species Coragyps atratus atratus and Cathartes aura septentrionalis (with notes on Cathartes aura falklandica, Pseudogyps bengalensis, and Neophron percnopterus)." Journal of Morphology 115 (1964): 153.
 Bang, Betsy G., and Frederik B. Bang. "Laryngotracheitis virus in chickens: a model for study of acute nonfatal desquamating rhinitis." The Journal of experimental medicine 125.3 (1967): 409-428.
 Bang, Betsy G., and F. B. Bang. "Localized lymphoid tissues and plasma cells in paraocular and paranasal organ systems in chickens." The American journal of pathology 53.5 (1968): 735.
 Bang, Betsy G., and Frederik B. Bang. "Replacement of virus-destroyed epithelium by keratinized squamous cells in vitamin A-deprived chickens." Proceedings of the Society for Experimental Biology and Medicine 132.1 (1969): 50-54.
 Bang, Betsy G. "Functional anatomy of the olfactory system in 23 orders of birds." Acta. Anat. 79 (1971): 1-76.
 Bang, Betsy G., Frederik B. Bang, and Marie A. Foard. "Lymphocyte depression induced in chickens on diets deficient in vitamin A and other components." The American journal of pathology 68.1 (1972): 147.
 Bang, Betsy G. Functional Anatomy of the Olfactory System in 23 Orders of Birds: With 27 Figures and 1 Table. München: Karger, 1971. Print.
 Bang, Betsy G., Marie A. Foard, and Frederik B. Bang. "The effect of vitamin A deficiency and Newcastle disease on lymphoid cell systems in chickens." Proceedings of the Society for Experimental Biology and Medicine 143.4 (1973): 1140-1146.
 Bang, Betsy G., et al. "T and B lymphocyte rosetting in undernourished children." Proceedings of the Society for Experimental Biology and Medicine 149.1 (1975): 199-202.
 Bang, Betsy, and Molly Bang. The Old Woman and the Red Pumpkin: A Bengali Folk Tale. New York: Macmillan, 1975. Print.

References

1912 births
2003 deaths
20th-century translators
20th-century American zoologists
American ornithologists
American translators
Bengali–English translators
American folklorists
George Washington University alumni
Johns Hopkins University alumni
Medical illustrators
Scientific illustrators
Women ornithologists